Eyes on Me can refer to several musical works:

"Eyes on Me" (Celine Dion song)
"Eyes on Me" (Faye Wong song)
"Eyes on Me" (Superfly song)
"Eyes on Me" (Yu Yamada song)
"Eyes on Me", a song by Misia from Mars & Roses
"Eyes on Me" (Iz*One Concert Series)

See also
All Eyes on Me (disambiguation)